A 3270 Emulator is a terminal emulator that duplicates the functions of an IBM 3270 mainframe computer terminal on a computer, usually a PC or similar microcomputer.

As the original 3270 series terminals were connected to the host computer through a display controller (cluster controller) using coaxial cable, emulators originally required channel (rare), coax or synchronous communication adapter cards to be installed in the PC.  Today, many emulators communicate with the mainframe computer through a TN3270 server using the TN3270 variant of the Telnetprotocol common on TCP/IP networks including the Internet, so special hardware is no longer required on machines with Internet access. Several vendors offered both coax and communications attached 3270 emulators and TN3270 clients as part of the same product.

Connectivity 

One way of categorizing a 3270 simulator is by how it connects to the host.

Some 3270 simulators use a channel adapter to connect directly to the host. This is common in protocol converters or other situations where performance justifies the higher cost.

Some 3270 simulators use a coax adapter such as the Irma board to connect to a cluster controller.

Some 3270 simulators use a synchronous serial link to connect to a communications controller. Using BSC requires less code, but SDLC with SNA allows more functionality.

Some 3270 simulators use a LAN interface to a cluster controller.

Contemporary 3270 simulators typically use TN3270 to connect to a TN3270 server on the host.

Products
 
In 1983, IBM marketed the IBM 3270 PC, a bundled package including a PC, a graphics adapter, 3270 emulation software and coax interface card. 3270 emulators and TN3270 clients are also available from many third-party vendors like Attachmate and Ericom.  Some solutions permitted a coax interface to be shared by workstations in a LAN.

See also
Irma board
Terminal emulator
Systems Network Architecture (SNA)
Synchronous Data Link Control (SDLC)
TN3270
TN3270 Plus
IND$FILE

Notes

External links

x3270: open-source, multi-platform TN3270 client

TN3270: emulator for Linux, Windows, Mac OS X
Virtel: terminal thin-client emulation for 3270 mainframe screens

QWS3270 PLUS, a TN3270 client by Jolly Giant Software
QWS3270 Secure, a TN3270E client by Jolly Giant Software
Vista tn3270, a TN3270 emulator by Tom Brennan Software
Rocket BlueZone: a 3270 terminal emulator by Rocket Software
Nexus Terminal, a TN3270/TN5250, SSH, SFTP/FTPS and printer client by Nexus Integration
Flex Terminal Emulator, a TN3270 client by FlexSoftware Inc
Mocha TN3270, a TN3270 client by Mochasoft
Extra! X-treme, a TN3270 client by Attachmate
Host Explorer, a TN3270 client by OpenText (formerly Hummingbird)
Personal Communications, PCOMM: a 3270 emulator and  TN3270 client by IBM
tn3270 X, a TN3270 emulator for Mac OS from Brown University
Flynet Viewer, a web-based client by Flynet
Host Access for the Cloud, a highly available, cloud deployed, web-based client by Micro Focus
Inventu Viewer+, Fastest, Most Functional Web Terminal Emulator by Inventu
TNZ emulator, a python 3.6+ library / emulator may interest you if you write software that automates 3270 terminal interactions or if you just use a 3270 terminal emulator. 

Terminal emulators